The Hacienda La Puente Unified School District (HLPUSD) is a school district located in Southern California. It is the largest school district in the east San Gabriel Valley in terms of student population, serving 20,000 students from the unincorporated community of Hacienda Heights, portions of the cities of Industry, La Puente and West Covina and portions of the unincorporated communities of Avocado Heights, Valinda and West Puente Valley. The district's headquarters are located in the city of Industry.

Schools
Comprehensive high schools
 La Puente High School, La Puente
 Los Altos High School, Hacienda Heights
 Glen A. Wilson High School, Hacienda Heights
 William Workman High School, City Of Industry

Alternative High Schools
 Puente Hills School/Community Day School, La Puente
 Valley Alternative High School, Hacienda Heights
 Stimson Learning Center, Hacienda Heights

K-8 Schools
 Lassalette School, La Puente
 Fairgrove Academy, La Puente
 Grandview School, Valinda
 Mesa Robles School, Hacienda Heights
 Valinda School of Academics, La Puente
 Cedarlane Academy, Hacienda Heights

Middle schools
 Newton Middle, Hacienda Heights
 Orange Grove Middle, Hacienda Heights
 Sierra Vista Middle, La Puente
 Sparks Middle, La Puente

Elementary schools
 Baldwin Academy, La Puente, California
 Bixby Elementary, Hacienda Heights
 California Elementary, La Puente
 Del Valle Elementary, La Puente
 Kwis Elementary, Hacienda Heights
 Grazide Elementary, Hacienda Heights
 Los Altos Elementary, Hacienda Heights
 Los Molinos Elementary, Hacienda Heights
 Los Robles Academy, Hacienda Heights
 Nelson Elementary, La Puente
 Palm Elementary, Hacienda Heights
 Shadybend Elementary, Hacienda Heights
 Sparks Elementary, La Puente
 Sunset Elementary and Orthopedic Handicapped, La Puente
 Temple Academy, La Puente
 Wedgeworth Elementary, Hacienda Heights
 Wing Lane Elementary, Valinda
 Workman Elementary, La Puente

Board of Education

The Hacienda La Puente Unified School District Board of Education is composed of five members, elected every four years. The elections are held in November of even-numbered years and are elected by geographical district effective starting with the 2022 elections.

References

External links
 District homepage

School districts in Los Angeles County, California
Hacienda Heights, California
La Puente, California
City of Industry, California